The 1905 Kansas Jayhawks football team represented the University of Kansas as an independent during the 1905 college football season. In their second season under head coach A. R. Kennedy, the Jayhawks compiled a 10–1 record and outscored opponents by a combined total of 250 to 26. The Jayhawks played their home games at McCook Field in Lawrence, Kansas. Arthur Pooler was the team captain.

Schedule

References

Kansas
Kansas Jayhawks football seasons
Kansas Football